Damas noir is a synonym or alternative name for several wine grape varieties including:

Counoise
Mourvèdre
Prune de Cazouls
Syrah